Bovey is a surname of British origin, which originally meant a person from near the River Bovey in England. Notable people with the surname include:

Alixe Bovey (born 1973), British historian
Catherine Bovey (1669–1726), British philanthropist
Grant Bovey, British businessman and reality TV participant
Henry Bovey (1852–1912), Canadian engineer
Mungo Bovey (born 1959), British lawyer
Ralph Bovey (died 1679), British sheriff
Simon Bovey (born 1979), British writer
Victor H. Bovey (1856–1916), American politician

References

Surnames of English origin